The 1989 World Table Tennis Championships women's singles was the 40th edition of the women's singles championship.
Qiao Hong defeated Ri Pun-hui in the final by three sets to one, to win the title.

Results

See also
 List of World Table Tennis Championships medalists

References

-
World